Krynickie is a village in the administrative district of Gmina Zabłudów, within Białystok County, Podlaskie Voivodeship, in north-eastern Poland.

The village has an approximate population of 400.

References

Krynickie